Colin Aloysius MacPherson (1917–1990) was a Scottish Roman Catholic clergyman who served as the Bishop of Argyll and the Isles from 1968 to 1990.

Born in Lochboisdale on the island of South Uist, Scotland on 5 August 1917, he was ordained to the priesthood on 23 March 1940. He was appointed Bishop of the Diocese of Argyll and the Isles by the Holy See on 2 December 1968, and consecrated to the Episcopate on 6 February 1969. The principal consecrator was Igino Eugenio Cardinale, Titular Archbishop of Nepte, and the principal co-consecrators were Gordon Gray, Archbishop of St Andrews and Edinburgh and Stephen McGill, Bishop of Paisley.

He died in office on 24 March 1990, aged 72.

References 

1917 births
1990 deaths
Roman Catholic bishops of Argyll and the Isles
20th-century Roman Catholic bishops in Scotland
Scottish Roman Catholic bishops